Division General Juan Pablo Bennett Argandoña (January 25, 1871 – August 12, 1951) was a Chilean military officer and member of the Government Junta that ruled Chile between 1924 and 1925.

Juan Pablo Bennett was born in La Serena, the son of Charles (Carlos) Bennett Stacey and Buenaventura Argandoña Barraza. In 1903, he married Carlota Agacio Batres, with whom he had five children: Antonio, Maria Luisa, Juan, Carlota and Jenny.

He had a brilliant career in the army. In 1909 he was sent as military attaché to the Chilean embassy in Berlin. In 1924, he was named Minister of War and Navy, by President Arturo Alessandri.

On September 11, 1924, he joined the conservative military coup that ousted president Arturo Alessandri. He served as member of a Government Junta that ruled the country until January 23, 1925, together with General Luis Altamirano and Vice-Admiral Francisco Nef. On February 6, 1925, he was retired from active duty. He died in Santiago in 1951.

External links
Official family tree  

1871 births
1951 deaths
Heads of state of Chile
Chilean Ministers of Defense
Chilean people of English descent
Leaders who took power by coup
Chilean Army generals
People from La Serena